Bergueneuse is a commune in the Pas-de-Calais department in the Hauts-de-France region in northern France.

Geography
Bergueneuse consists of a village located 28 miles (42 km) northwest of Arras at the D94 and D71 road junction.

Population

Sights
 The seventeenth-century church.

See also
Communes of the Pas-de-Calais department

References

Communes of Pas-de-Calais